Roko Tui is the title for the executive head of any one of Fiji’s 14 Provincial Councils. Each province, called a "yasana", is administrated by a provincial council, which itself is subject to the Fijian Affairs Board, variously considered the “guardian” of the traditional Fijian administration system, amongst many other aspects of modern Fijian culture. The name Roko Tui is derived from what was traditionally used as a title (in some regions) denoting the Paramount Chief (like the title Roko Tui Dreketi), and so more often than not the modern role of Roko Tui is given to the Paramount Chief of the regions most chiefly clan.

Present Roko Tui
The fourteen provinces and the present Roko Tui are:

References

Government of Fiji